Hadžibulić is a surname. Notable people with the surname include:

Enes Hadžibulić (born 1981), Macedonian basketball player
Sead Hadžibulić (born 1983), Serbian footballer
Semir Hadžibulić (born 1986), Serbian-born Bosnia and Herzegovina footballer